Ratu Manunivavalagi Korovulavula, OF (born 22 June 1934 in Suva), is a Fijian political leader and civil servant.  A former Senator, Korovulavula was appointed Minister for Transport in the interim Cabinet of Commodore Frank Bainimarama on 8 January 2007, following the military coup on 5 December 2006. He had also previously served in Ratu Sir Kamisese Mara's Interim Cabinet after the 1987 coup led by Sitiveni Rabuka.  He was an unsuccessful candidate twice, for the Fijian Association Party and National Alliance Party, in the elections of 1999 and 2006, respectively.  He served as treasurer of both parties.

A career civil servant, Korovulavula started as a soldier and fought in the Malayan Campaign against the Chinese Communists in the 1950s.  He has held a number of government positions, among them that of CEO of Land Transport Authority the former Department of Road Transport. He had first worked as a civil servant in LTA (Land Transport Authority of Fiji) then worked in Parliament House in the early 2000.

He holds Professional Qualification from Australia and UK and is a Member of the Chartered Institute of Transport and Logistics in the United Kingdom.

Korovulavula has also held positions as a Sports Administrator, being the Chairman of the Fiji Sports Council in the 1980s and is a Life Member of the Fiji Basketball Federation.

Korovulavula also is a well known music composer and singer and was leader a famous Fijian band the Southern Brothers in the 1950s to 1970s.  His hits included "Nuku Vulavula", (Ena Veivei Gauna) "Vakanananu Lesu", "Au Moce Buna Au Qai Tadra", (Ni Lutu Na Yakavi Ena Toba Ko) "Suva".

Following the 2006 Fijian coup d'état he was appointed as Minister of Transport, Works and Energy in the interim military regime. He was replaced as a Minister in a cabinet reshuffle in January 2008. He was subsequently controversially appointed to the Public Accounts Committee.

Korovulavula was made an Officer of the Order of Fiji in the Republic of Fiji Honours List in the early 2000s for his services as administrator in the field of music, having co-founded the Fiji Composers Association and Fiji Performing Right Association and holding Chairmanship of both organisations and helping improve the livelihood and welfare of Fiji musicians and composers.

In 2014 he wrote a book about the Malayan campaign.

Personal life 
Ratu Manu grew up during the World War years when American and New Zealand soldiers were stationed in Fiji. As a young boy Manu lived with his grandparents, Ivamere Korovulavula and Jovesa Korovulavula, his father, Major Isireli Korovulavula, was an officer in the Fijian army and fought in the war when World War II had taken place, he was awarded the Military Cross. Ratu Manu attended Suva Methodist Boys School at Toorak.

References

Fijian civil servants
I-Taukei Fijian members of the Senate (Fiji)
1934 births
Living people
Officers of the Order of Fiji
National Alliance Party of Fiji politicians
Transport ministers of Fiji
Fijian Association Party politicians